Generval Martiniano Moreira Leite, better known as Astro de Ogum (born October 16, 1957) is a Brazilian politician. He is an alderman of São Luís and president of Municipal Chamber.

Political career 
In 1992, Astro de Ogum competed to alderman of São Luís, without success.

In 2000, Astro de Ogum was elected alderman of São Luís.

In 2002, Astro de Ogum endorsed Jackson Lago and Lula.

In 2004, Astro de Ogum was reelected alderman of São Luís. Endorsed Tadeu Palácio.

In 2006, Astro de Ogum endorsed Jackson Lago and Lula.

In 2008, Astro de Ogum was reelected alderman of São Luís. Endorsed João Castelo.

In 2010, Astro de Ogum endorsed Jackson Lago and José Serra.

In 2012, Astro de Ogum was reelected alderman of São Luís. Endorsed João Castelo.

In 2014, Astro de Ogum endorsed Lobão Filho and Aécio Neves.

In 2015, he became an ally of Flávio Dino when joining the Party of the Republic (PR).

In 2016, Astro de Ogum was reelected alderman of São Luís. Endorsed Edivaldo Holanda Júnior.

References 

1957 births
Living people
People from São Luís, Maranhão
Communist Party of Brazil politicians
Liberal Party (Brazil, 2006) politicians
Party of National Mobilization politicians
Cidadania politicians
Avante (political party) politicians
Brazilian Democratic Movement politicians
Liberal Front Party (Brazil) politicians
Democratic Social Party politicians